Leucastea is a genus of beetles in the family Megalopodidae, containing the following species:

 Leucastea alluaudi Pic, 1944
 Leucastea antennata Weise, 1909
 Leucastea antica Westwood, 1864
 Leucastea atrimembris Pic, 1933
 Leucastea atripennis Westwood, 1864
 Leucastea biformis Weise, 1919
 Leucastea bimaculata Jacoby, 1900
 Leucastea concolor Westwood, 1864
 Leucastea dahomeyensis Jacoby, 1901
 Leucastea dimidiata Westwood, 1864
 Leucastea dohrni Stål, 1855
 Leucastea donckieri Pic, 1913
 Leucastea ephippiata Westwood, 1864
 Leucastea fairmairei (Stål, 1855)
 Leucastea femoralis Weise, 1919
 Leucastea fenestrata Weise, 1919
 Leucastea fulvipennis (Baly, 1855)
 Leucastea letestui Pic, 1944
 Leucastea lugens Stål, 1855
 Leucastea maculatipes Pic, 1913
 Leucastea nana Stål, 1855
 Leucastea nigroapicalis Pic, 1940
 Leucastea occipitalis Weise, 1902
 Leucastea plagiata (Klug, 1834)
 Leucastea rubidipennnis Westwood, 1864
 Leucastea senegalensis (Lacordaire, 1845)
 Leucastea sjostedtii Weise, 1909
 Leucastea stibapicalis Pic, 1944
 Leucastea westermanni Westwood, 1864

References

Megalopodidae genera
Taxa named by Carl Stål